The 2017 BNP Paribas Primrose Bordeaux was a professional tennis tournament played on clay courts. It was the tenth edition of the tournament which was part of the 2017 ATP Challenger Tour. It took place in Bordeaux, France between 15 and 21 May 2017.

Singles main-draw entrants

Seeds

 1 Rankings are as of May 8, 2017.

Other entrants
The following players received wildcards into the singles main draw:
  Geoffrey Blancaneaux
  Laurent Lokoli
  Corentin Moutet
  Gleb Sakharov

The following player received entry into the singles main draw as a special exempt:
  Pedro Sousa

The following players received entry from the qualifying draw:
  Benjamin Bonzi
  Maxime Janvier
  Mackenzie McDonald
  Tommy Paul

Champions

Singles

 Steve Darcis def.  Rogério Dutra Silva 7–6(7–2), 4–6, 7–5.

Doubles

  Purav Raja /  Divij Sharan def.  Santiago González /  Artem Sitak 6–4, 6–4.

External links
Official Website

BNP Paribas Primrose Bordeaux
BNP Paribas Primrose Bordeaux
2017 in French tennis